Adolf Zilmer (also Adolf Zillmer; 1892 Vaabina Parish (now Antsla Parish), Kreis Werro – 16 March 1936 Tallinn) was an Estonian politician. He was a member of II Riigikogu. He was a member of the Riigikogu since 22 March 1924. He replaced Rudolf Pälson. On 9 April 1924, he resigned his position and he was replaced by Eduard Tiiman.

References

1892 births
1936 deaths
People from Antsla Parish
People from Kreis Werro
Workers' United Front politicians
Members of the Riigikogu, 1923–1926